Janiabad (also Romanized as Jānīābād) is a village in Nujin Rural District, in the Central District of Farashband County, Fars Province, Iran. At the 2006 census, its population was 182, in 39 families.

References 

Populated places in Farashband County